SaudiSat-4 is a Saudi-Arabian micro-satellite launched in 2014. It was built by the National Satellite Technology Center at KACST.

Launch
SaudiSat-4 was launched from Dombarovsky (air base) site 13, Russia, on 19 June 2014 by a Dnepr rocket.

Mission
The satellite is intended primarily for technology verification in space, main test piece being UV light diodes, intended for removal of static charge from the proof mass. Proof mass experiment is expected to pave the way to engineering of gravitational reference sensor (GRS) of drag-free spacecraft. This devise has an applications for the tentative Laser Interferometer Space Antenna gravity wave detector.

See also

 2014 in spaceflight

References

External links

Satellites of Saudi Arabia
Spacecraft launched in 2014
2014 in Saudi Arabia
Spacecraft launched by Dnepr rockets